Henry Calvert Simons (October 9, 1899 – June 19, 1946) was an American economist at the University of Chicago. A protégé of Frank Knight, his antitrust and monetarist models influenced the Chicago school of economics.  He was a founding author of the Chicago plan for monetary reform that found broad support in the years following the 1930s Depression, which would have abolished the fractional-reserve banking system, which Simons viewed to be inherently unstable.  This would have prevented unsecured bank credit from circulating as a "money substitute" in the financial system, and it would be replaced with money created by the government or central bank that would not be subject to bank runs.

Simons is noted for a definition of economic income, developed in common with Robert M. Haig, known as the Haig–Simons equation.

Work

Program of reform
In one of his essays, A Positive Program for Laissez Faire (1934) Simons set out a program of reform to bring private enterprise back to life during the Great Depression.

Eliminate all forms of monopolistic market power, to include the breakup of large oligopolistic corporations and application of antitrust laws to labor unions. A Federal incorporation law could be used to limit corporation size and where technology required giant firms for reasons of low cost production the Federal government should own and operate them... Promote economic stability by reform of the monetary system and establishment of stable rules for monetary policy... Reform the tax system and promote equity through income tax... Abolish all tariffs... Limit waste by restricting advertising and other wasteful merchandising practices.

Henry Simons argued for changing the financial architecture of the United States to make monetary policy more effective and mitigate periodic cycles of inflation and deflation. The goal of changing the "monetary rules of the game" in this way was to "prevent… the affliction of extreme industrial fluctuations".

Corporate finance and the business cycle
According to Simons, financial disturbances in the economy are perpetuated by "extreme alternations of hoarding and dis-hoarding" of money. Short-term obligations (loans) issued by banks and corporations effectively create "abundant (fiat) money substitutes during booms". When demand becomes sluggish, a sector of the economy undergoes a shrinkage, or the economy as a whole begins to lapse into depression, "hopeless efforts at liquidation" of the secondary monies, or "fire sales," result.

Simons believed that a financial system so structured would be "repeatedly exposed to complete insolvency". In due course, government intervention would inevitably be necessary to forestall insolvency due to traders' bad bets and margin calls by lenders.

A recent example would be the $10 billion bailout by the Federal Reserve of Bear Stearns, a multinational global investment bank, in 2008. John Mauldin, a senior member of the financial services industry, writes: "If Bear had not been put into sound hands and provided solvency and liquidity, the credit markets would simply have frozen… The stock market would have crashed by 20% or more… We would have seen tens of trillions of dollars wiped out in equity holdings all over the world."  The Bear Stearns debacle was a watershed event in a housing market crisis that precipitated massive devaluations, left the economy reeling, and required massive government action.

This is the chain of events predicted by Henry Simons in the event of a large-scale liquidation of inflated securities such as mortgage loans. In Economic Policy for a Free Society Simons writes that all it takes to precipitate a massive liquidation of securities is "a relatively small decline of security values". Simons is emphatic in pointing out that corporations that traded on a "shoestring of equity, and under a mass of current liabilities" are "placing their working capital precariously on call," and hence at risk, in the event of the slightest financial disturbance.

Banking reform

In Simons' ideal economy, nothing would be circulated but "pure assets" and "pure money," rather than "near moneys," "practically moneys," and other precarious forms of short-term instruments that were responsible for much of the existing volatility. Simons, an opponent of the gold standard, advocated non interest-bearing debt and opposed the issuance of short-term debt for financing public or corporate obligations. He also opposed the payment of interest on money, demand deposits, and savings. Simons envisioned private banks which played a substantially different role in society than they currently do. Rather than controlling the money supply through the issuance of debt, Simons' banks would be more akin to "investment trusts" than anything else.

In the interest of stability, Simons envisioned banks that would have a choice of two types of holdings: long-term bonds, or consols, and cash. Simultaneously, they would hold increased reserves, up to 100%. Simons saw this as beneficial in that its ultimate consequences would be the prevention of "bank-financed inflation of securities and real estate" through the leveraged creation of secondary forms of money.

Simons advocated the separation of deposit and transaction windows and the institutional separation of banks as "lender-investors" and banks as depository agencies. The primary benefit would be to enable lending and investing institutions to focus on the provision of "long term capital in equity form" (233). Banks could be "free to provide such funds out of their own capital".  Short-term interest-based commercial loans would be phased out, since one of the "unfortunate effects of modern banking," as Simons viewed it, was that it had "facilitated and encouraged the use of short-term financing in business generally".

Money supply
Simons believed the price level needed to be more flexible to accommodate fluctuations in output and employment. To this end, he advocated a minimum of short-term borrowing, and a maximum of government control over the circulation of money. This would result in an economy with a greater tolerance of disturbances and the prevention of "accumulated maladjustments" all coming to bear at once on the economy. In sum, for Simons, a financial system in which the movement of the price level was in many ways beholden to the creation and liquidation of short-term securities is problematic and threatens instability.

Notes

References
 
 Kasper, Sherryl. The Revival of Laissez-Faire in American Macroeconomic Theory: A Case Study of Its Pioneers (2002), ch 3
 Mauldin, John, peter. "Thoughts on the Continuing Crisis." Frontline Weekly Newsletter. 21 March 2008.
 Oakeshott, Michael. The Political Economy of Freedom, in: Cambridge Journal, Volume II, 1949; now in: Michael Oakeshott, Rationalism in Politics and Other Essays (1962), Indianapolis, Liberty Fund, 1991 (New and expanded edition), pp. 384–406.
 Simons, Henry C. "Economic Policy for a Free Society." University of Chicago Press, Chicago, IL. (1948), pp. 165–248
 Stein, Herbert. “Simons, Henry Calvert," The New Palgrave: A Dictionary of Economics (1987), v. 4, pp. 332–35

External links

 The Forgotten Henry Simons – Florida State University College

Guide to the Henry C. Simons Papers 1925-1972 at the University of Chicago Special Collections Research Center

1899 births
1946 deaths
People from Virden, Illinois
Economists from Illinois
University of Chicago faculty
Columbia University alumni
20th-century American economists
Chicago School economists